Tractor Tom is a British computer-animated children's TV programme, produced by the Contender Entertainment Group and Hibbert Ralph Entertainment. Two series were produced, consisting of 26 eleven-minute episodes each, which was aired between 9 February 2002 and 2004 respectively. It was the first program produced by home media distributor Contender, who later went on to produce and replace with the preschool show Peppa Pig.

The show originally aired on CITV in the UK, and also aired in other countries like New Zealand and Australia and in Canada, where it played on Kids' CBC over there.

Background
Set on the idyllic Springhill Farm, brave and resourceful Tractor Tom and his human, animal, and vehicle friends have fun and adventures at both work and play.

The first series featured Liza Tarbuck and James Nesbitt as Farmer Fi and Matt and respectively  Enn Reitel as the narrator, with the vehicles communicating through their respective sounds (chugging for Tom, revving for Buzz, Rev, and Rory, and spluttering and wheezing for Wheezy; excluding the French dub). The second series, however, introduced new voice actors for Fi & Matt, and the vehicles now had the ability to talk. New characters were introduced in the second series as well. Some of the vehicle characters from Series 1 were minorly redesigned in season 2 to feature moving mouth parts to accommodate their new voices. Enn Reitel retained his role as narrator throughout both series, remaining until the end of series 2.

Sales from DVDs of series one contributed to the Great Ormand Street Hospital Children's Charity (although this is stated on the DVD covers the reference has been removed from the official site), as "Tractor Tom, what would we do without you" was the slogan for the series.

Characters

Vehicles
Tom is a cheerful bright red tractor who is optimistic and always tries to solve his friends' problems. He is also afraid of the dark sometimes. Tom always knows the safety rules and can get a bit angry when somebody disobeys orders. He seems to be the arguably closest friend of Buzz. He likes helping him out.
Buzz is a young and inquisitive blue and yellow quadbike who is sometimes said to be "too small". He also liked to get into trouble with Snicker the foal in the first series, and arguably Tom's closest friend. Now in the second series, he is now a well behaved boy and likes helping Tom out.
Wheezy is the farm's slow, old, and large yellow combine harvester who enjoys telling stories in the first series and likes to stay in the barn, which is the "home" of most of the vehicles. In "Two Harvesters", he was told by Rev that he was challenging Roly. Also, he sometimes doesn't like going out of the barn in the second series. In "The Quiet Place", his first quiet place got a bit distracted, until with the help of Tom, he had a new one.
Rev is a large purple pickup truck belonging to Matt the farmhand that often boasts and his least favourite thing is coming second or last in a race. Though he isn’t a villain-like character, he is sometimes disagreeable. He is Tom's best friend and seems to tell Wheezy to challenge Roly to a race in a field in "Two Harvesters". Also, he hates getting dirty or carrying dirty stuff (only when he said that in "Come Back Dusty" when he was carrying manure for Mr. Aziz's roses).
Rora was introduced at the beginning of the second series as a white and hot pink-coloured motorbike and replaced Buzz as Farmer Fi's on-road vehicle. An energetic character who is good friends with Dusty and has a friendly rivalry with Rev. When she isn't driving Fi around, she always likes teasing Rev. She can get a bit bossy. She is never sleepy (only in "A Song for the Farm", all because of Dusty's sleep-talking and Matt's snoring).
Dusty was introduced early in the second series as a yellow and orange aeroplane and is energetic and friendly. She seems to be good friends with Rora. In "A Song for the Farm", she talks in her sleep, which causes Rora to wake up and not get enough sleep. She hates having baths in "Come Back Dusty", because she will get soap in her eyes. She seems to do the loop-the-loops.

Humans
Farmer Fi is the sole farmer of Springhill Farm, who wears a pink shirt and hat, blue trousers with a yellow flower at the bottom and has blond hair. In the second series she wears blue overalls. She only needs one employee, Matt, because she owns a very small farm. She is voiced by Liza Tarbuck in the first series.
Matt lives in a small silver caravan down the road from the farm, and often helps with the work on the farm. He is rather forgetful and mentally clumsy, especially in the second series. He owns Rev the truck and drives in him everywhere. He is voiced by James Nesbitt in the first series.

Animals
There are three brown hens on Springhill Farm.
Wack is one of the two ducks on the farm. He wears an orange collar. In "Wild Ducks", he didn't want to say hello to the wild ducks at first.
Bach is the other duck which wears a blue collar. He, just like Wack, seems to not make friends with the wild ducks at first in "Wild Ducks".
Riff is the farm's sheepdog who likes to associate with the other animals, and likes rounding them up like the sheep. In "The Big Picnic", she seems to want Fi's pie.
Purdey is Farmer Fi's pet cat who is rather lazy and is a friend of Wheezy's.
Mo is the only cow on the farm and hence sometimes gets lonely but otherwise an ordinary cow character.
Winnie is a horse who tends to not be very excited, except when it comes to carrots.
Snicker is Winnie's foal who likes to get into mischief with Buzz and his favourite food is sugar cubes, but also, like Winnie, loves carrots. Notably one of the few male animals on the farm.
There are eight sheep who like to use strange non-animal objects such as helter-skelters, central heating systems, and baths. They also love to get into mischief and go into Matt's caravan when unwanted.

Mentioned or guests
Farmer Allsop runs the neighbouring farm to Farmer Fi's. He is mentioned many times, but made no appearances.
Roly - Farmer Fi has borrowed Farmer Allsop's harvester twice when Wheezy wasn't available. He looks exactly like Wheezy but is blue and is much faster. In his first appearance in "Where's Wheezy?", he only appeared as a non-speaking, unnamed character harvesting the wheat, but his name was revealed to be Roly in his second appearance in "Two Harvesters", and was given a voice. He was a bully towards Wheezy at first and Rev challenged him and Wheezy to a race with Dusty commentating. He and Wheezy eventually became friends.
Mr Aziz only mentioned once by the narrator when Rev was carrying manure for his roses in "Come Back Dusty". He made no appearances.
Rory - Identical to Rora, but only appeared in the last episode of the first season "Rodeo", when hired by Matt. He is orange.
There are three wild ducks that appeared in "Wild Ducks", when they were migrating and stopped for a rest. The wild ducks were a trio of male Mallard Ducks.
It is unknown if the rabbit that appeared in the first season to steal the animals' food is the same one that appeared in the second season, visiting Wheezy's "quiet place".
Fi's parents - Fi's mother phoned her once, not making an appearance, worrying about Fi's father's sudden illness, which turned out to be not serious. As Fi said, it was "just my mum worrying. You know what she's like."
Jerry runs the sports centre and talked to Matt on the phone once. He made no appearances.

Episodes

Season 1 (2002)

Season 2 (2004)

Rerun airings
 ABC Kids (Australia)

External links 

 Tractor Tom - Official Channel on YouTube

References

2000s British children's television series
2000s British animated television series
2002 British television series debuts
2003 British television series endings
British computer-animated television series
British children's animated adventure television series
British children's animated comedy television series
British preschool education television series
English-language television shows
ITV children's television shows
CBC Television original programming
Television series by Entertainment One
Animated preschool education television series
2000s preschool education television series